Mohammad Shirvani is an Iranian alternative filmmaker. He was born in 1973 in Tehran, Iran. In 1998 He escaped from the military service to make his first short film “The circle”. In 1999 “The Circle” was selected for Critics' Week International Cannes festival. Being selected by Cannes Festival made a great impact on the young director and since then he has become a full time filmmaker. He has never limited his professional career and has made movies in every form including experimentals, documentaries, short films and feature films. His films have been screened in more than 400 international festivals and events.
His last international award is the Golden Tiger Awards for Best Feature Film for “Fat Shaker” in Rotterdam, 2013.

His third feature film will be released in January 2021

Filmography

Short films

Documentary Films

Video Art

Feature  Films

Performance Art

Installation Art

Awards 
The Circle, Best Short Film - Fajr IFF - Tehran- 1999
The Circle, Selected for Critics' Week International -Cannes IFF, France- 1999
The Candidate, Grand Prize - Marseilles  IDFF, 2000
Iranian Conserve, Best Short Film - Cinema Tout  Ecran IFF, Geneva - 2004  
Iranian Conserve,Jury Prize - Cracow IFF, Poland - 2005
Navel,Grand  Prize - Split IFF, Croatia - 2004
President Mir Qanbar, Award  of  Excellence - Yamagata - IDFF, 2005
President Mir Qanbar, Magnolia Award  for Best Social Documentary  -  Shanghai TV  IFF, 2006
Iranian Cookbook, Best Experimental Documentary Film - Cinema Verite  IDFF, Tehran - 2010
Iranian Cookbook, Best Film of Audience Award  .  Yamagata IDFF, 2011
Iranian Cookbook, Japan Community  Cinema Center    Award -  Yamagata  IDFF, 2011
Fat Shaker, Tiger Award for The Best Film - Rotterdam IFF, 2013

External links

Iranian film directors
Iranian documentary filmmakers
People from Tehran
1973 births
Living people